Rada Rassimov (born Rada Đerasimović (Serbian Cyrillic: Рада Ђерасимовић) on 3 March 1941 in Trieste, Italy) is an Italian actress of Serb origin, who has appeared in film since the early 1960s and television since 1975.

Biography
Born to Serbian parents, Velimir and Vera (née Petrijević) Đerasimović, she attended, along with her two brothers, the Serbian Jovan Miletić Grammar School in Trieste where her father was the dean and teacher since 1927. Later, she went to university and took acting classes with her brother Ivan in Rome. Her career was at its peak in the 1960s and 1970s although she has appeared in film as recently as 2003. She is perhaps best known in world cinema for her appearance in Sergio Leone's Spaghetti Western The Good, the Bad and the Ugly in 1966 in which she played the role of María, beaten by Lee Van Cleef's character, mercenary "Angel Eyes". Since 1975 she has worked predominantly on Italian television. She now lives in Paris.

Her brother Ivan Rassimov, who died in a motorcycle accident in 2003, was also an actor. She also had a younger brother, Milovan Djerasimović (1945–2012), a music professor in Trieste.

Filmography

Una tragedia americana (1962, TV Mini-Series) - La signora Brent
Sfida al re di Castiglia (1963) - Anna Coronel
I maniaci (1964) - Rosetta, the French Teacher (segment "Il week-end")
Per il gusto di uccidere (1966) - Isabelle
The Good, the Bad and the Ugly (1966) - Maria
Massacre Mania (1967) - Nicole Bouvier
Non aspettare Django (1967) - Mary Foster
Toufan bar farase Petra (1968)
Gatling Gun (1968) - Mrs. Treble
Il seme dell'uomo (1969)
Django the Bastard (1969) - Alethea / Alida Murdok
The Seven Headed Lion (1970) - Marlene
Necropolis (1970)
The Cat o' Nine Tails (1971) - Bianca Merusi
 (1971) - Anita
A cuore freddo (1971) - Silvana0
Die rote Kapelle (1973, TV Mini-Series) - Margarete Barcza
Baron Blood (1972) - Christina Hoffmann
Stregoni di città (1973)
Kidnap (1974) - Marta
Grandeur nature (1974) - Isabelle
L'olandese scomparso (1974, TV mini-series) - Anne Magnolato
Il tempo dell'inizio (1974)
Witchcraft of the City (1974)
Un uomo curioso (1975, TV movie) - Contessa Luisa
Michel Strogoff (1975, TV mini-series) - Sangarre
Processo a Maria Tarnowska (1977, TV mini-series) - Maria Tarnowska
Hungarian Rhapsody (1979)
Allegro barbaro (1979)
Bel Ami (1979, TV Mini-Series) - Madeleine Forestier
Orient-Express (1982, TV mini-series) - Wanda
Mein Bruder und ich (1982, TV movie) - Elvira Fioretti
Quartetto Basileus (1983) - Madame Finkal
La freccia nel fianco (1983, TV Mini-Series)
Un caso d'incoscienza (1984, TV movie)
The Third Solution (1988)
Gli angeli del potere (1988, TV movie)
Lost Love (2003) - Clara Pasini (final film role)

References

External links

 

1941 births
Italian film actresses
Italian television actresses
Living people
Western (genre) film actresses
Spaghetti Western actresses
Italian people of Serbian descent
Actors from Trieste